Aangan is a 1973 Bollywood family drama film directed by Nasir Hussain. It stars Farida Jalal, Deb Mukherjee, Indrani Mukherjee, Ashim Kumar, Dilip Raj, Leela Mishra and Nazir Hussain.  The film revolves around two brothers and the misunderstandings caused by the younger brother's wife.

Hussain wrote the story, screenplay and dialogue for the film aside from directing it, for producers Jagdish Massand and Pratap Kumar, who produced the film under the J. P. Films banner. The music of the film was composed by the music director duo Sonik-Omi, with lyrics by Indeevar.

Plot
The story is about two brothers leading a contented life in a joint family. The older one is married and he and his wife look after the younger brother as their own son. Misunderstandings occur when the younger one marries and brings his wife to live in the joint family. The younger brother's wife disturbs the equilibrium of the family maintained by the older brother and his wife. Finally, the disagreements are sorted out with the family living together cohesively.

Cast
Deb Mukherjee
Farida Jalal
Indrani Mukherjee
Nazir Hussain
Ashim Kumar
Leela Mishra
Tun Tun
Jayshree T.
Dilip Raj

Music
Song list:

References

External links
 

1973 films
1970s Hindi-language films
1973 drama films
Films directed by Nasir Hussain
Films scored by Sonik-Omi
Hindi-language drama films